The Aquila A 211 is a German, two seat side-by-side configuration light aircraft, built by Aquila Aviation.

Design and development
The A 211 is the follow on to the A 210. The A 211 is a low wing, side by side seating, single engine aircraft with tricycle landing gear. The aircraft is certified under German/EASA Part 21.17 rules. The A 211 is similar to the Aquila A 210 but has a revised spinner, cowling and canopy.

Variants
Aquila A 210
Earlier model
Aquila A 211
Conventional instrument panel
Aquila A 211GX
Glass cockpit model

Specifications (A 211)

See also

References
 

2000s German sport aircraft
Low-wing aircraft
Single-engined tractor aircraft
Aircraft first flown in 2000